Danish–Swedish farmdog is a breed of dog that has its origin in Denmark and southern Sweden, but has become popular all over Scandinavia. It is a native breed which has historically lived on farms in the eastern part of Denmark and southernmost part of Sweden (i.e. on both sides of Øresund, the narrow strait that separates the Danish island of Zealand from the southern tip of the Scandinavian peninsula), serving as a guard dog, rat catcher and hunting dog. The breed's soft and gentle temperament also makes them excellent companion dogs.
There are some indications that the breed originates from the pinscher breeds and the British white hunting terriers.

Name 
The Danish–Swedish Farmdog became a recognized breed in Denmark and Sweden in 1987.  At that time, the two countries got together and agreed on the name of the breed, and also on the breed standard written by judge and breeder Lars Adeheimer, Sweden and judge Ole Staunskjaer, Denmark. The DSF was used as a farm dog for many hundreds of years, and before becoming a recognized breed it was known under the local name "Skrabba", "Skåneterrier", "råttehund", "rat dog").

Appearance 
The FCI standard says that a DSF should be 30–39 cm of height with a compact body. The relation between withers height and body length should be 9 to 10. The head is rather small and triangular with a well-emphasized stop. The coat is hard, short and smooth in texture, with white as a dominating colour, with one or several patches of different colour combination. The tail could be long, half bobtail or bobtail.

Temperament 
The Danish–Swedish Farmdog is a very friendly, easygoing breed. Not only does it work on farms as a rat exterminator and watch dog, but it is also a companion to adults, and is known to befriend and play with the children of the household.

The Danish–Swedish Farmdog is unlike a terrier – even though it is often mistaken as one – it is very mild and gentle in temper. Unlike the high-strung nature of the terrier, the milder nature of the DSF allows it to do its job, as well as be calm and affectionate when unoccupied. This makes it an ideal house dog.

The DSF is a not a high energy dog, but loves having a job. The breed is new to the US, and can only now start to be seen in sports such as flyball and dog agility. The DSF is also known for its excellent mousing skills and can perform sports such as going to ground and earthdog. They are also very speedy and quick, and love all types of lure coursing.

In 2010, the breed club, Danish-Swedish Farmdogs USA, made application to AKC-FSS for recognition of the breed. In January 2011, the American Kennel Club (AKC) added the breed to its Foundation Stock Service. The Danish-Swedish Farmdog is now eligible to compete in various AKC companion events such as obedience, agility, rally and more. In November 2011, the AKC announced that as of July 2012, FSS breeds would be eligible for Open Conformation shows.

See also
 Dogs portal
 List of dog breeds

References

External links 
Danish/Swedish Farmdog Club of America, Inc.
FarmdogsUSA.
FCI Breed Standard
The official Danish Farmdog Club
The official Swedish Farmdog Club
American Kennel Club Foundation Stock Service

FCI breeds
Dog breeds originating in Denmark
Dog breeds originating in Sweden